The 1988 Houston Cougars football team represented the University of Houston during the 1988 NCAA Division I-A football season. The Cougars were led by second-year head coach Jack Pardee and played their home games at the Astrodome in Houston, Texas. The team competed as members of the Southwest Conference, finishing in third. Just two seasons after finishing 1–10 (0–7 SWC), the Cougars finished the season with a 9–3 record and ranked 18th in the final AP Poll. They were invited to the 1988 Aloha Bowl in Honolulu, Hawaii, where they lost to Washington State.

Schedule

Source:

Roster

Game summaries

at Texas

Wyoming

Team players in the NFL

References

Houston
Houston Cougars football seasons
Houston Cougars football
Houston Cougars football